Paul Kim may refer to:

 Paul Kim (academic) (born 1970), Korean-American chief technology officer at the Stanford Graduate School of Education
 Paul Kim (Anglican bishop) (born 1952), Anglican bishop in South Korea
 Paul Kim Ok-kyun (1925–2010), Roman Catholic bishop in South Korea
 Paul Kim (pianist), American classical pianist
 Paul Kim & Sons, American classical pianist group led by the pianist
 Paul C. Kim, director of marketing for Everex
 Paul Kim (musician, born 1981), Korean American musician, singer and rapper who was a contestant on American Idol
 Paul Kim (musician, born 1988), South Korean singer